2016–17 NB I is the 72nd season of the Hungarian Championship (Nemzeti Bajnokság I) organized under the supervision of Magyar Röplabda Szövetség (MRSZ).

Team information 

The following 11 clubs compete in the NB I during the 2016–17 season:

Regular season

|}
Updated to games played on 13 March 2017.

Results

Playoff 
The eight teams that finished in the places 1 to 8 in the Regular season, compete in the Playoff (1–8).

Final
In the Playoff's final the two qualified teams play against each other in a series where the team winning three games will become the 2016–17 NB I championship. The team that finished in the higher Regular season place will be played the first, the third and the fifth (if it is necessary) game of the series at home.

Linamar BRSE – Vasas Óbuda (3–0)

|}

Season statistics

Number of teams by counties

Final standings

External links
 Hungarian Volleyball Federaration 

Nemzeti Bajnoksag
Nemzeti Bajnoksag
Nemzeti Bajnoksag
Nemzeti Bajnoksag
Nemzeti Bajnoksag seasons